Spooky Empire is an American multigenre convention focused primarily on horror and science fiction, held bi-annually in Florida. The convention, which is billed as "the dark side of Comic-Con", features vendors, a film and tattoo festival, music, and celebrity guests.

History
Co-founded by Peter Mongelli, Spooky Empire has been held in Florida since 2003. It is held twice a year, in the spring and in the autumn. The first event, held in 2003, took place at a Holiday Inn in Broward County, Florida. The convention was held in Orlando, Florida from 2006 to 2019, before moving to Tampa, Florida for its autumn 2019 event due to a lack of sufficient available venue space in Orlando.

Celebrity guests at Spooky Empire have included Gillian Anderson, Fairuza Balk, Bruce Campbell, Neve Campbell, Alice Cooper, David Duchovny, Gunnar Hansen, Kane Hodder, Christopher Lloyd, Malcolm McDowell, Bill Moseley, Cassandra Peterson, Sam Raimi, Burt Reynolds, Christina Ricci, George A. Romero, Felissa Rose, Lewis Teague, Henry Thomas, Danny Trejo, Dee Wallace, and Carl Weathers.

References

External links 
 

Multigenre conventions
Horror conventions
Recurring events established in 2003
2003 establishments in Florida
Conventions in Florida